Donald Kirk Willis (born July 15, 1973 in Goleta, California) is a former American football guard in the National Football League. He was signed by the Seattle Seahawks as an undrafted free agent in 1995. He played college football at North Carolina A&T and Washington. Willis was the head coach at his high school alma mater, Cabrillo High School, in Lompoc, California.  He also has coached track and field.

Willis also played for the New Orleans Saints and Kansas City Chiefs.

1973 births
Living people
People from Goleta, California
Players of American football from California
American football offensive guards
North Carolina A&T Aggies football players
Washington Huskies football players
Seattle Seahawks players
Sportspeople from Santa Barbara County, California
New Orleans Saints players
Kansas City Chiefs players